Michael "Mike" Yakawich is an American politician serving as a member of the Montana House of Representatives from the 51st district. He was appointed to the House in April 2022.

Early life and education 
Yakawich is a native of Butte, Montana. He earned a Bachelor of Arts degree in psychology from the University of Montana in 1980 and graduated from the Unification Theological Seminary in 1987.

Career 
From 1995 to 2018, Yakawich operated a small business, Yakawich Gifts. From 2014 to 2022, he served as a member of the Billings City Council. Yakawich also worked as a regional director of the Global Peace Foundation. On April 19, 2022, members of the Yellowstone County Board of Commissioners appointed Yakawich to succeed Frank Fleming in the Montana House of Representatives.

Personal life 
Yakwich was raised Catholic and joined the Unification Church in 1979. He and his wife, Yukiko, have five children. He is a pastor at the Montana Family Church, a congregation affiliated with the  Family Federation for World Peace and Unification.

References 

Living people
Republican Party members of the Montana House of Representatives
Politicians from Billings, Montana
People from Yellowstone County, Montana
University of Montana alumni
People from Butte, Montana
Unification Theological Seminary graduates
American Unificationists
Year of birth missing (living people)